The 1889 Penn Quakers football team was an American football team that represented the University of Pennsylvania in the 1889 college football season. In its second season under head coach Woody Wagenhorst, the team compiled a 7–6 record and outscored opponents by a total of 198 to 165. No Penn players were honored on the 1889 All-America team.

Schedule

References

Penn
Penn Quakers football seasons
Penn Quakers football